The 2010–11 Phoenix Coyotes season was the franchise's 15th season in Phoenix, Arizona, 32nd in the National Hockey League and 39th overall.

Off-season 
On June 17, the Coyotes announced their eight-game pre-season schedule, which includes two split-squad games and a game against Dinamo Riga of the Kontinental Hockey League (KHL) in Riga, Latvia.

Schedule and results

Pre-season

Regular season

Standings

Schedule and results

Playoffs 

On April 8, 2011, the Coyotes clinched their second consecutive Stanley Cup playoff berth with a 4–3 victory over the San Jose Sharks at Jobing.com Arena. It was the first time since the 1999–2000 season that the Coyotes have gone to the post-season two consecutive years. The Coyotes faced the Detroit Red Wings in the first round for the second consecutive year. Just before the start of the playoffs, news started to spread that when the Coyotes were eliminated from the playoffs, that the announcement would be made that the team would be moving to Winnipeg for the next season. The Coyotes players and coaching staff refused to use this distraction as an excuse.

Key:  Win  Loss

Player statistics

Skaters

Goaltenders 

†Denotes player spent time with another team before joining Coyotes. Stats reflect time with the Coyotes only.
‡Traded mid-season.
Bold/italics denotes franchise record.

Awards and records

Records

Milestones

Awards

Transactions 
On December 16, 2010, Tom Fenton, a former college goaltender, was signed to a one-day amateur contract as an emergency backup to Jason LaBarbera after Ilya Bryzgalov became ill and could not play. He is a graduate student and a hockey coach at Manhattanville College, and had not played regularly since 2009 at American International College. His uniform number was 35, but he used his college mask with his college number, 30.

The Coyotes have been involved in the following transactions during the 2010–11 season.

Trades

Free agents acquired

Free agents lost

Claimed via waivers

Lost via waivers

Player signings

Draft picks 
Phoenix's picks at the 2010 NHL Entry Draft in Los Angeles, California.

See also 
 2010–11 NHL season

Farm teams 
San Antonio Rampage
The San Antonio Rampage are the Coyotes American Hockey League affiliate in 2010–11.

Las Vegas Wranglers
The Las Vegas Wranglers are the Coyotes ECHL affiliate in 2010–11.

 Arizona Sundogs
On October 13, 2010, the Coyotes and Sundogs signed an affiliate agreement for the Coyotes to place players with the Sundogs. The Arizona Sundogs are members of the Central Hockey League.

References 

Arizona Coyotes seasons
P
P